Jack Silvagni (born 17 December 1997) is an Australian rules footballer who represents  in the Australian Football League (AFL).

He is a third-generation Carlton footballer; both his father, Stephen, and paternal grandfather, Sergio, played for Carlton and are legends in the club's Hall of Fame. He is also a second cousin once removed of former Carlton teammate Alex Silvagni and the brother of former teammate Ben Silvagni.

Early life & Junior career
Silvagni grew up in the Melbourne suburb of Balwyn North and attended Xavier College. He played junior football for his school, the Greythorn Falcons, the Doncaster Cats in the Yarra Junior Football League, the Oakleigh Chargers in the TAC Cup, and Victoria Metro at the AFL Under-18 Championships. His mother is Australian television presenter and model Jo Silvagni, and he has two younger brothers, Ben and Tom.

AFL career
Silvagni was drafted with the 53rd selection in the 2015 AFL draft under the father–son rule when Carlton matched Essendon's bid for him. He was given the No. 2 guernsey for the 2016 season; then, after the retirement of its incumbent Andrew Walker at the end of 2016, switched to the No. 1 guernsey which father Stephen and grandfather Sergio had both famously worn.

In the 2017 season, Silvagni received the AFL Rising Star nomination for round 13 following his performance against the Gold Coast Suns in which he kicked two crucial last-quarter goals, helping his side to a ten-point win. After spending more time as a midfielder in the 2018 season, Silvagni was amassing more handballs and tackles as opposed to goals. Some pundits believed he wasn't living up to expectations, though; however, a lot of people, including the coach, had faith in him.

Jack moved back to his drafted position as a third tall forward during the 2019 AFL Season, where he was occasionally used as a utility player, providing an option further afield rather than an inside-50 marking target. Jack enjoyed career-high disposal numbers in 2019, averaging 13.8 per game. The year 2020 was a highly interrupted one for Jack, sustaining a bruised lung and fractured rib during a win against Essendon Football Club, for which Essendon midfielder Zach Merrett received a one-match ban after the Match Review Officer reviewed the game and charged Merrett with striking. Compounding his injury woes, Jack went under the knife in August to have a small ITB (Iliotibial band) release procedure. These injuries would mean that Jack only took the field for a total of three games for the 2020 season. 

Silvagni returned to the field regularly during Carlton's 2021 season. He continued to play as a third tall forward while also rotating through the midfield as a back-up ruckman whenever Carlton went into games with only one recognised ruckman; although he was generally quite undersized compared with his ruck opponents, he was often effective at nullifying tap-outs and winning the ball at ground level.

Silvagni played a career-high 21 games during Carlton's 2022 season. He averaged 14.19 disposal per game, a career record to this point.

Personal life
Silvagni is currently studying a Bachelor of Property and Real Estate/Bachelor of Commerce at Deakin University.

Statistics
Statistics are correct to the end of Round 3, 2021

|-
|- style="background-color: #EAEAEA"
! scope="row" style="text-align:center" | 2016
|style="text-align:center;"|
| 2 || 8 || 7 || 7 || 53 || 23 || 76 || 26 || 25 || 0.9 || 0.9 || 6.6 || 2.9 || 9.5 || 3.3 || 3.1
|-
! scope="row" style="text-align:center" | 2017
|style="text-align:center;"|
| 1 || 20 || 19 || 17 || 144 || 57 || 201 || 90 || 51 || 1.0 || 0.9 || 7.2 || 2.9 || 10.1 || 4.5 || 2.6
|- style="background-color: #EAEAEA"
! scope="row" style="text-align:center" | 2018
|style="text-align:center;"|
| 1 || 15 || 6 || 4 || 93 || 68 || 161 || 45 || 42 || 0.4 || 0.3 || 6.2 || 4.5 || 10.7 || 3.0 || 2.8
|- style="background-color: #EAEAEA"
! scope="row" style="text-align:center" | 2019
|style="text-align:center;"|
| 1 || 17 || 13 || 11 || 146 || 89 || 235 || 73 || 62 || 0.8 || 0.6 || 8.6 || 5.2 || 13.8 || 4.3 || 3.6
|-
! scope="row" style="text-align:center" | 2020
|style="text-align:center;"|
| 1 || 3 || 2 || 2 || 12 || 4 || 16 || 5 || 2 || 0.7 || 0.7 || 4.0 || 1.3 || 5.3 || 1.7 || 0.7
|-
! scope="row" style="text-align:center" | 2021
|style="text-align:center;"|
| 1 || 2 || 2 || 2 || 17 || 8 || 25 || 6 || 4 || 1.0 || 1.0 || 8.5 || 4.0 || 12.5 || 3.0 || 2.0
|-
! colspan=3| Career
! 65
! 49
! 43
! 465
! 249
! 714
! 245
! 186
! 0.8
! 0.7
! 7.2
! 3.8
! 11.0
! 3.8
! 2.9
|}

References

External links

 Profile in Blueseum

1997 births
Living people
Preston Football Club (VFA) players
Oakleigh Chargers players
People educated at Xavier College
Carlton Football Club players
Australian people of Italian descent
Australian rules footballers from Melbourne
People from Balwyn, Victoria